Anja Knauer (born 18 March 1979) is a German actress who has played the leading female role in some German films.

Early life
Knauer grew up in the Sasel quarter of the borough of Wandsbek with her younger brother, Tim. She joined a child modelling agency after being spoken to in the Alstertal-Einkaufszentrum, a shopping centre, when she was 15. After completing her abitur in Hamburg, Knauer studied film and literature at the Free University of Berlin. Anja's brother Tim also works as an actor, but is better known for his work as a voice dubbing artist.

Acting
In 1996, when she was 17, Knauer gained her first role in Martin Gies's ZDF television film Kleine Einbrecher. The film Küss mich, Frosch, in which Knauer was the leading actress and played alongside Matthias Schweighöfer, won an Emil, a Goldener Spatz and an Erich Kästner-Fernsehpreis (for the screenplay), and was nominated for an Emmy Award.

Design
Knauer works as a set designer, and has also worked on the design of rooms in the Michelberger Hotel in Berlin.

Filmography
 1998: SK Kölsch
 1998: Frühstück zu viert
 1999: Die Angst in meinem Herzen
 1999: Die Schule am See
 1999: Im Namen des Gesetzes
 1999: SOS Baracuda
 1999: Die Strandclique
 1999: Klinikum Berlin Mitte – Leben in Bereitschaft
 2000: Küss mich, Frosch
 2000: Küstenwache
 2000: Alarm für Cobra 11 – Die Autobahnpolizei
 2001: 
 2001: Ein Fall für zwei
 2002: Leipzig Homicide
 2002: Annas Heimkehr
 2002/03: Wilde Jungs – Men in Blue
 2003: Clipper – Kompass der Liebe
 2003: Schlosshotel Orth
 2003: Plötzlich ist es Liebe
 2003: Wind über den Schären
 2004: Tsunami
 2004: Ums Paradies betrogen
 2005: Das Haus am Väner See
 2005: Auf immer und ewig und einen Tag
 2005: Amazing Grace
 2006: Delire de negation
 2006: Zepp
 2006: Im Leben eine eins
 2006: Der Himmel über Cornwall
 2007: Hilfe, die Familie kommt!
 2007: Ein Fall für zwei
 2008: 
 2009: Pfarrer Braun
 2009: Meine Tochter und der Millionär
 2009: Résiste – Aufstand der Praktikanten
 2009: Ein starkes Team
 2010: Kommissar LaBréa - Mord in der Rue St. Lazare
 2010: Kommissar LaBréa - Todesträume am Montparnasse
 2010: Familie Dr. Kleist
 2010: Doctor's Diary
 2011: Spreewaldkrimi – Die Tränen der Fische
 2011: Alarm für Cobra 11 – In der Schusslinie
 2011: Der Sandmann
 2011: Die letzte Lüge
 2011: Der Staatsanwalt
 2011: In guten wie in schlechten Tagen
 2012: In aller Freundschaft - Magie
 2012: Der Landarzt
 2012: SOKO Wismar
 2012: Im Weissen Rössl
 2013: Die Bergretter
 2016: Gut zu Vögeln
 2017: Inga Lindström: Liebesreigen in Samlund

References

External links

 
 Homepage Anja Knauer

Actresses from Hamburg
German television actresses
German film actresses
Free University of Berlin alumni
1979 births
Living people
20th-century German actresses
21st-century German actresses